Pandelis Karayorgis (born 1962) is a Greek-born and Boston-based pianist, composer and educator.

Life and career
Karayorgis was born in Athens, Greece in 1962. He began classical piano lessons at the age of 9, but by the end of high school he was in love with jazz and beginning to play gigs while pursuing a degree in Economics. In 1985, Karayorgis went to Boston to attend the New England Conservatory, where he earned BM and MM degrees in music while studying with Paul Bley, Jimmy Giuffre, George Russell, and Joe Maneri among others.

He studied and performed extensively the music of Thelonious Monk and Lennie Tristano. In the nineties, he worked closely with violinist Mat Maneri producing several recordings mostly in duo format. During the same time, he also co-led a group with Eric Pakula featuring much of the Tristano repertoire, and collaborated with Argentine saxophonist and composer Guillermo Gregorio.

He recorded for labels such as Cadence, Leo, Nuscope, OkkaDisk, Clean Feed, hatOLOGY, Not Two, and Driff, an artist-run label co-founded by Karayorgis and Jorrit Dijkstra. Some of the most extensive recording/performing collaborations have been with Nate McBride, Curt Newton, Luther Gray, Jef Charland, Randy Peterson, Ken Vandermark and Dave Rempis. His projects include the Pandelis Karayorgis Trio, the electric trio mi3, the quartet Construction Party, the quintet System of 5, and the Whammies, a group dedicated to the music of Steve Lacy.

Discography

As leader/co-leader

With The Whammies
 The Whammies Play the Music of Steve Lacy (Driff, 2012)
 The Whammies Play the Music of Steve Lacy, Vol. 2 (Driff, 2013)
 The Whammies Play the Music of Steve Lacy, Live Vol. 3 (Driff, 2014)

As sideman

With Guillermo Gregorio
 Approximately (hatART, 1996)
 Red Cube (hatOLOGY, 1999)

References

External links
Official site
A bounty of brilliance from Boston pianist Pandelis Karayorgis at Chicago Reader
Pianist focuses on the essentials at The Boston Globe

1962 births
Living people
Post-bop pianists
Avant-garde jazz pianists
New England Conservatory alumni
Musicians from Athens
21st-century pianists
Okka Disk artists
Cadence Jazz Records artists
Clean Feed Records artists
Leo Records artists